Goa Velha is a small town in Ilhas de Goa subdistrict, Goa state, India. It should not be confused with the World Heritage Site of the historical city of Old Goa. St Andrew's is its parish church. It is well known for its yearly 'Procession of the Saints' (Konkani: Santanchem Pursanv)

History
The town of Goa Velha was a southern suburb of the City of Goa, which was the original capital of Portuguese India. The Plagues of Goa in the 16th and 18th century gradually brought about the decline in the city's population. Goa Velha was one of the few areas on the Ilhas de Goa where populations of people began to cluster around.

Geography
Goa Velha is located adjacent to Pilar in Ilhas, North Goa. By road it is approximately 2.5 kilometres north-west of Agaçaim, 12 kilometres south-east of the capital Panjim, 17 kilometres north-east of Vasco da Gama, and 22 kilometres north of the South Goa district headquarters Margão.

Demographics

Population
, Goa Velha had a population of 4,322 . Males constitute 53% of the population and females 47%.

Literacy
Goa Velha has an average literacy rate of 89.17%, higher than the state average of 88.70%: male literacy is 82%, and female literacy is 71%. In Goa Velha, 9% of the population is under 6 years of age.

Religion
68.12% of the population is Christian, 27.97% is Hindu and 3.77% is Muslim.

Goa Velha Census Town has total administration over 1,055 houses to which it supplies basic amenities like water and sewerage. It is also authorized to build roads within Census Town limits and impose taxes on properties coming under its jurisdiction.

References

Cities and towns in North Goa district
Colonial Goa